Daniel Jutras  (born 1960) is a Canadian lawyer and academic specializing in civil and comparative law and current rector of the Université de Montréal in Quebec, Canada.

Career
Jutras became a member of the Barreau du Quebec in 1984. From 1985 to 2020, he taught law at McGill University. During his time at McGill, he became director of the Institute of Comparative Law from 1998 to 2002, served as dean of the McGill Faculty of Law from 2009 to 2016, and held the Wainwright Chair in Civil Law since 2010 to 2020.

Jutras served as executive legal officer for the Chief Justice at the Supreme Court of Canada, the Right Honourable Beverley McLachlin, from 2002 to 2004.

Following a ten-month consultation process, Jutras was selected as successor to Guy Breton as rector of the Université de Montréal. He began his five-year mandate on 1 June 2020.

Honours
Jutras was named an Officer of the Order of Canada in recognition of his contributions to university life, Canadian political life and innovation in teaching.

He was awarded a Queen Elizabeth II Diamond Jubilee Medal in 2013.

In 2014, he  was awarded the Advocatus emeritus distinction from the Barreau du Québec.

Personal life
Jutras is married to Manon Savard, Chief Justice of Quebec.

References

Academic staff of McGill University
Université de Montréal alumni
Harvard University alumni
Academic staff of the Université de Montréal
Living people
1960 births
Officers of the Order of Canada